Steindachnerina elegans is a fish species in the genus Steindachnerina found in rivers in Bahia and Minas Gerais, Brazil.

References

External links 

 FishBase December 2012

Curimatidae
Fish of South America
Fauna of Brazil
Fish described in 1875
Taxa named by Franz Steindachner